Princess Angeline ( – May 31, 1896), also known in Lushootseed as Kikisoblu, Kick-is-om-lo, or Wewick, was the eldest daughter of Chief Seattle.

Biography
She was born around 1820 to Chief Seattle in what is now Rainier Beach in Seattle, Washington. She was named Angeline by Catherine Broshears Maynard, the second wife of Doc Maynard. In 1856, during the Puget Sound War, she is said to have conveyed a warning from her father to the citizens of Seattle regarding an imminent attack by a large native coalition force. Thanks to this warning, the settlers and neutral native tribespeople were able to protect themselves during the resulting Battle of Seattle.

The 1855 Treaty of Point Elliott required that all Duwamish Indians leave their land for reservations, but Kikisoblu remained in Seattle in a waterfront cabin on Western Avenue between Pike and Pine Streets, near what is now Pike Place Market. She did laundry and sold handwoven baskets. Like her father, Kikisoblu became a Christian and remained a Roman Catholic until her death on May 31, 1896. She was buried (in a canoe-shaped coffin) in Lake View Cemetery on Capitol Hill, next to Henry Yesler. Years later, Seattle schoolchildren raised money for a headstone.

The Chronicle of Holy Names Academy reported:
May 29, 1896. With the death of Angeline Seattle died the last of the direct descendants of the great Chief Seattle for whom this city was named. Angeline—Princess Angeline—as she was generally called, was famous all over the world… Angeline was a familiar figure of the streets, bent and wrinkled, a red handkerchief over her head, a shawl about her, walking slowly and painfully with the aid of a cane; it was no infrequent sight to see this poor old Indian woman seated on the sidewalk devoutly reciting her beads. The kindness and generosity of Seattle’s people toward the daughter of the chief… was shown in her funeral obsequies which took place from the Church of Our Lady of Good Help. The church was magnificently decorated; on the somber draped catafalque in a casket in the form of a canoe rested all that was mortal of Princess Angeline.

Legacy
S. Angeline Street on Seattle's Beacon Hill and in Columbia City and Seward Park was named after Princess Angeline. Also Angeline and S. Angeline in her Tribal home land of Suquamish (Kitsap County).
She also appears in the Cherie Priest novel Boneshaker.

In photos, Kikisoblu most often appears wearing a red bandana, shawl, and many layers of clothing. She was photographed by people such as F. Jay Haynes, Edwin J. Bailey, Frank La Roche, Edward S. Curtis, and others.

In Seattle, the YWCA has a shelter named after her. According to their website, "Our Angeline's Day Center for Women provides safety and support for women experiencing homelessness. Our shelter opens daily from 8 a.m. and helps women transition into permanent housing. Located in Belltown, this is an area that would have been Princess Angeline's stomping ground. While we recognize and appreciate Princess Angeline, we also recognize the displacement of the Duwamish Tribe and the impact that had on their tribe."

References

 Seattle Times: Angeline
 History Link: Angeline
 City of Seattle: Atlantic City (Angeline's birthplace) Boat Ramp

Further reading

Available online through the Washington State Library's Classics in Washington History collection
Available online through the Washington State Library's Classics in Washington History collection
 This source gives Angeline credit for saving Seattle residents from a massacre.

Duwamish tribe
Native American basket weavers
American women artists
People from King County, Washington
People from Seattle
1820 births
1896 deaths
Converts to Roman Catholicism from pagan religions
History of Seattle
Native American history of Washington (state)
Native American Roman Catholics
Native American women artists
Women basketweavers
Catholics from Washington (state)
19th-century Native American women
19th-century American women artists